Jiří Veselý was the defending champion, but lost in the quarterfinals to eventual champion Mikhail Kukushkin. 

Kukushkin won the title, defeating Márton Fucsovics in the final, 6–1, 6–2.

Seeds

Draw

Finals

Top half

Bottom half

External Links
Main Draw
Qualifying Draw

UniCredit Czech Open - Singles